The Metropolitan Cathedral of Our Lady of the Conception, also Campinas Cathedral, is a Catholic church in Campinas in the state of São Paulo, Brazil. It was inaugurated in 1883 and is located in the Jose Bonifacio Square, popularly known as the Cathedral Square, in the city center. It is dedicated to Our Lady of Conception.

Construction of a new church in Campinas was approved by the City Council in 1807. It was constructed on being the huge bases using rammed earth construction. The structure built by the slaves and blessed by the vicar. It was inaugurated in 1883. The cathedral received new ornaments on the facade during a large-scale restoration in 1923.

Protected status

Our Lady of the Conception Cathedral is listed as a historic structure by the city of Campinas, the state of São Paulo, and by the National Historic and Artistic Heritage Institute in 1969. The structure was registered under the Book of Historical Works, Inscription 764-T.

See also
Roman Catholicism in Brazil
Our Lady of the Conception

References

Roman Catholic cathedrals in São Paulo (state)
Roman Catholic churches completed in 1883
National heritage sites of São Paulo (state)
19th-century Roman Catholic church buildings in Brazil
Neoclassical church buildings in Brazil
Buildings and structures in Campinas